Victor Alfonzo Rojas Ford (born 18 February 1995) is a Venezuelan football player who currently plays as a midfielder for OFC Barca in the United Premier Soccer League.

Rojas began his professional career playing in the Major Arena Soccer League with Florida Tropics SC. He also featured for the Tropics' outdoor USL PDL side, scoring a brace in his final game with the organization.

In March 2021, Rojas was named to the United Premier Soccer League 2020 Fall Season First Team, having tallied 13 goals and 10 assists in 15 games.

References

External links

1995 births
Living people
Venezuelan footballers
Venezuelan expatriate footballers
A.D. Nogueirense players
Las Vegas Lights FC players
Association football midfielders
USL Championship players
Expatriate footballers in Mexico
Expatriate soccer players in the United States
Venezuelan expatriate sportspeople in the United States
Venezuelan expatriate sportspeople in Mexico
Expatriate footballers in Portugal
Venezuelan expatriate sportspeople in Portugal
Major Arena Soccer League players
Florida Tropics SC players
USL League Two players
Lakeland Tropics players
United Premier Soccer League players
People from Miranda (state)